Karen LeGresley (born 1 March 1951) is a Canadian former freestyle swimmer. She competed in two events at the 1972 Summer Olympics in Munich, Germany.

References

External links
 

1951 births
Living people
Canadian female freestyle swimmers
Olympic swimmers of Canada
Swimmers at the 1972 Summer Olympics
Swimmers from Toronto